Hornsherred is a peninsula between Roskilde Fjord and Isefjord on the island of Zealand in eastern Denmark.

It falls within the expanded Frederikssund municipality and includes Jægerspris and Skibby and before 1 January 2007 a part of Bramsnæs Municipality, now a part of Lejre Municipality. It is connected to Frederikssund by the Kronprins Frederik bridge which was built in 1935. The area is increasingly popular as a venue for tourists with facilities for walking, cycling and sailing.

Attractions
Hornsherred has a variety of attractions including Jægerspris Castle, the Færgegård Museum of Local History and the walking and cycling tracks around the peninsula. There is a yachting harbour at Jægerspris. The peninsula also has a number of stone age burial sites. Skibby Church with frescoes dating back to the middle ages is one of the main cultural attractions.

References

External links

 Frederikssund / Hornsherred Tourist Office

Hornsherred
Geography of Frederikssund Municipality
Hundreds of Denmark